The 2015 CECAFA Cup Group Stage was the opening round of the CECAFA Cup, a competition played between national teams from the Council for East and Central Africa Football Associations.

The Group Stage took place from November 21-28, 2015, and consisted of twelve teams divided into three groups of four, with each team playing every other in the group in a round–robin format. The best two teams from each group automatically advanced to the quarterfinals, and the two best third-placed teams advanced as well.

The biggest wins of the group stages were all 4–0 wins: Tanzania beat Somalia, Uganda beat Zanzibar, and Sudan beat Djibouti. The only other game that contained four goals was a 3–1 win for Zanzibar over Kenya.

No team won all of its games; Tanzania and South Sudan were the most successful teams as they both earned seven of nine possible points (two wins and a draw).

Group A

Group B

Group C

2015 CECAFA Cup